Drs. George and Blanche Laughlin House is a historic home located at Kirksville, Adair County, Missouri. It was built in 1925, and is a two-story, Colonial Revival style rectangular brick dwelling with a two-story kitchen wing and attached garage.  It features a semicircular front portico supported by Corinthian order columns and with curved steps.

The Laughlin House currently serves as the designated residence for Truman State University's president. The space is used for University events primarily.

It was listed on the National Register of Historic Places in 2014.

References

Houses on the National Register of Historic Places in Missouri
Colonial Revival architecture in Missouri
Houses completed in 1937
Buildings and structures in Adair County, Missouri
National Register of Historic Places in Adair County, Missouri
1937 establishments in Missouri